Ukrainian company Precision Systems developed a miniaturized handheld version of AGS-17 called RGSh-30 "in order to create a grenade launcher that could respond to the needs of Ukrainian units and special forces operating in the Donbas" that can be carried like an assault rifle. RGSh-30 is designed to disable armored vehicles. RGSh-30 uses magazines with five 30mm VOG-17 grenades.

Precision Systems plans to develop versions using 20mm, 25mm, and 40mm grenades.

Users

See also
Neopup PAW-20
RGS-50M
AGS-40 Balkan
RGM-40 Kastet
GM-94
DP-64
MRG-1
Fort-600

References

Weapons of Ukraine
Grenade launchers
Automatic grenade launchers